The Norwegian Ship Registers, sometimes called NIS-NOR is a Norwegian government agency responsible for operating the Norwegian International Ship Register, the Norwegian Ship Register and the Norwegian Shipbuilding Register. The register is subordinate to the Norwegian Ministry of Trade and Industry (and not the Ministry of Transport) and based in Bergen.

Water transport in Norway
Ship Register
Ship registration